The Young Loner is a 1968 TV movie from Disney. It was directed by Michael O'Herlihy.

Cast
Edward Andrews as Bert Shannon
Kim Hunter as Freda Williams 
Butch Patrick as Bumper
Frank Silvera as Carlos
Jane Zachary as Angie

References

External links
The Young Loner at IMDb

1968 television films
1968 films
Films directed by Michael O'Herlihy
American television films